Jieshou is a county-level city under the administration of Fuyang City, located on the Huang-Huai Plain in northwestern Anhui province, People's Republic of China. Jieshou, an important commercial port and gateway, borders Henan Province on the west and the Ying River, a major tributary of the Huai River flows in a southeasterly direction across the county to Fuyang. According to the "China Statistical Yearbook" the population of Jieshou city stood at 109,103 in 2010, while GeoNames, puts the population at over 140,000 inhabitants. Covering a total area of 667 square kilometers, the county-level city comprises three urban sub-districts of Jieshou, and in the surrounding rural area a further 15 towns and townships make up the total population of 740,000.

History 
During the Qing dynasty Jieshou was part of the Yingzhou Prefecture.

Administrative divisions 
In the present, Jieshou City has3 sub-districts, 12 towns, and 3 townships.
Sub-District
 Dongcheng
 Xicheng
 Yingnan

Town

Township
 Bingji
 Jinzhai
 Renzhai

Climate

References 

Cities in Anhui
Fuyang